Since 1656, at least 300 tropical cyclones have affected the Mascarene Islands in the southern Indian Ocean. The archipelago consists of several islands, including Mauritius, Réunion, and Rodrigues. Mauritius claims responsibility for several Outer Islands, including St. Brandon and Agaléga, and has disputed territorial claims of Tromelin Island and the Chagos Archipelago. The deadliest tropical cyclone to affect the region was one that struck Mauritius in 1892, which killed 1,200 people, left 50,000 people homeless, and destroyed one-third of the capital Port Louis.

Since 1950, there have been 249 human fatalities related to tropical cyclones in the Mascarene Islands. The deadliest storms since then were cyclones Carol in 1960, which killed 42 on Mauritius, and Jenny in 1962, which killed 17 on Mauritius and 32 on Réunion. The storms' close succession led to improved building codes. All known worldwide tropical cyclone precipitation records occurred on Réunion. This included a storm in 1958 that dropped  of rainfall at Aurere over 48 hours. During a 24-hour period in January 1966, Cyclone Denise dropped  of rainfall at Foc Foc, of which  fell over 12 hours; both precipitation totals set records for their respective durations. In 1968, Cyclone Monique produced the highest wind gust on Rodrigues –  at a station in the mountainous interior. The highest recorded wind gust on Mauritius –  at Mon Desert – occurred when Cyclone Gervaise struck the island in February 1975; the cyclone killed 10 people on the island and caused about US$200 million in damage.

During the 1980s, 27 cyclones affected the archipelago, beginning with Cyclone Hyacinthe, the wettest tropical cyclone on record after it dropped  of rainfall over 14 days in January 1980 at Commerson Crater in the mountainous peaks of Réunion. In 1989, Cyclone Firinga caused US$217 million in damage from its high wind gusts. In the 1990s, 34 storms affected the Mascarene Islands, most notably Cyclone Bella in 1990, which damaged or destroyed 1,500 homes on Rodrigues, as well as Cyclone Hollanda, which caused the Mauritius gross domestic product to decline by 10%. Since 2000, 64 storms affected the archipelago. In 2002, Cyclone Dina produced the highest wind gusts on Réunion, reaching . Cyclone Gamede dropped record rainfall over a four-day period in 2007, when Commerson Crater in Réunion's mountainous interior recorded  of rainfall, breaking the world record for the most precipitation recorded over 72 hours and 96 hours, set previously during Cyclone Hyacinthe in 1980. The most recent storm to affect the island group was Cyclone Joaninha in March 2019.

Background and climatology
The Mascarene Islands are located in the Indian Ocean east of Madagascar. The island group has been known to the Arab world since the 10th century, and to Europeans since the 16th century. In 1638, the Dutch started a colony on Mauritius, but abandoned it after a severe cyclone struck in 1695. The French settled nearby Réunion in 1655, and colonized Mauritius in 1715, naming it Isle de France. During the Napoleonic Wars, the British took over Mauritius, maintaining possession of the island until 1968 when Mauritius became independent. The British also briefly took possession of Réunion from 1810 to 1815, until it was returned to France, which operates the island as an overseas department.

According to a study from 1989, on average two storms pass within  of Réunion or Mauritius each year, with a landfall about every five years.

List of storms

Pre-1800s
1615 – A storm on Mauritius wrecked the ship Peter's Booth.
February 9, 1695 – A powerful cyclone struck Mauritius, destroying much of the island.
January 25, 1710 – A powerful cyclone struck Mauritius, sinking a boat that was intended to evacuate the island's Dutch population. Residents drowned while crossing streams to reach a ship on the other side of the island.
December 23, 1723 – A powerful cyclone affected Mauritius.
February 4, 1731 – The public archives in Mauritius were destroyed by a passing cyclone.
March 13, 1734 – A powerful cyclone passed near Mauritius.
March 8, 1743 – A strong cyclone passed near Mauritius.
February 1748 – A strong storm

1800s

February 1800 
1806 – A storm affected Mauritius during the year.
February 3, 1807 – 
February 26, 1807 – 
March 6, 1811 – 
March 21, 1811 – 
February 26, 1812 – 
February 19, 1813 – 
February 3, 1814 – 
April 19, 1814 – 
February 6, 1815 – 
February 17, 1815 – 
January 22, 1816 – 
February 14, 1817 – 
January 25, 1819 – 
March 29, 1819 – 
December 15, 1820 – 
February 21, 1823 – 
March 6, 1823 – 
February 23, 1824 – 
April 11, 1824 – 
December 6, 1824 – 
March 10, 1825 – 
February 24, 1826 – 
December 27, 1826 – 
January 8, 1827 – 
March 6, 1828 – 
March 25, 1828 – 
February 7, 1829 – 
March 27, 1830 – 
April 4, 1830 – 
March 4, 1832 – 
April 10, 1833 – 
January 20, 1834 – 
February 21, 1834 – 
April 30, 1834 – 
January 20, 1835 – 
March 5, 1836 – 
February 15, 1837 – 
April 10, 1840 – 
January 16, 1841 – 
January 16, 1843 – 
April 1843 – Rodrigues 
January 4, 1844 – 
February 20, 1844 – 
March 20, 1844 – 
December 20, 1844 – 
March 8, 1845 – 
January 28, 1847 – 
February 1847 – On an unknown date, a cyclone affected Mauritius.
March 8, 1848 – 
February 28, 1850 – 
March 20, 1851 – 
January 9, 1852 – 
January 23, 1852 – 
January 14, 1853 – 
March 5, 1853 – 
February 10, 1854 – 
January 22, 1855 – 
April 27, 1855 – 
February 2, 1856 – 
April 3, 1856 – 
December 1857 
1879 – 35 deaths 
April 29, 1892 – A powerful cyclone killed 1,200 people and injured 4,000 others on Mauritius. In about six hours, the cyclone knocked down 200,000 trees, left 50,000 people homeless, and wrecked about one-third of the capital Port Louis. 
January 12, 1895 –

1900s
March 21, 1904 – A cyclone struck Réunion's capital, killing 24 people.
March 5, 1931 – wind gusts 
February 4, 1932 – A small but powerful storm crossed Réunion, leaving around 100 deaths.
February 1, 1945 – A cyclone passed south of Mauritius, where wind gusts reached .
The storm killed 13 people and left over F300 million (US$6 million) in damage.
January 26, 1948 – A cyclone struck 165 deaths, wind gusts estimated –

1950s
March 17, 1952 1870 mm 

1960s

Alix killed eight people on Mauritius and injured more than 100 others. The cyclone destroyed more than 20,000 huts and buildings, leaving 21,000 people homeless.
Carol killed 42 people on Mauritius and seriously injured 95 others. The storm destroyed or seriously damaged about 100,000 houses, leaving over 15% of the island's population homeless, or over 100,000 people, of whom 70,000 stayed in emergency shelters. The high winds also wrecked about 60% of the sugar crop. Storm damage was estimated at RS450 million (US$95 million).
On the island, the storm killed 17 people, destroyed 1,300 buildings, and left more than 8,000 people homeless. Later that day, the storm struck Réunion, killing 36 people; wind gusts at the Roland Garros Airport reached . Jenny destroyed 3,851 homes on Réunion and severely damaged another 2,619, many of them wooden, leaving about 20,000 people homeless. The storm also destroyed crops, and wrecked about 80% of the island's telephone lines. After the close succession of Carol and Jenny, officials rebuilt most homes with concrete to withstand future storms.
October 13, 1962 – Weakening Tropical Storm Amy passed north of Rodrigues, producing hailstorms on the island. The storm also dropped heavy rainfall and produced moderate waves on Réunion.
December 4, 1962 – Cyclone Bertha passed between Mauritius and Rodrigues, producing gusty winds.
December 25, 1962 – Tropical Storm Cecile produced winds of  while passing just east of St. Brandon.
January 14, 1963 – Cyclone Delia brushed St. Brandon with  wind gusts. The cyclone also produced high seas along the Mascarenes while exiting the region.
February 10, 1963 – Developing Tropical Storm Fanny produced gusty winds and high seas in St. Brandon and Réunion before striking Madagascar.
March 4, 1963 – Tropical Storm Irene brought gusty winds to St. Brandon and Tromelin while developing and exiting the region.
March 9, 1963 – Cyclone Julie brushed Rodrigues with gusty winds while passing east of the island.
Over three days, the storm dropped heavy rainfall, reaching .
February 6, 1964 – Tropical Storm Eileen passed between Réunion and Madagascar, producing increased winds in the Mascarenes.
The rains caused flooding damage to crops.
March 5, 1964 – Tropical Storm Harriet passed north of the Mascarenes and near St. Brandon, generating gusty winds on the islands.
April 30, 1964 – Tropical Storm Jose brought gusty winds to Rodrigues while passing to its north.
December 5, 1964 – Tropical Disturbance Arlette produced increased winds while passing near St. Brandon, Mauritius, and Rodrigues.
December 9, 1964 – Tropical Storm Bessie brought gusty winds to St. Brandon, Réunion, and Mauritius.
February 6, 1965 – Tropical Depression Judy developed and remained north of the Mascarenes, generating high waves.
February 16, 1965 – Tropical Storm Kathleen passed southeast of Rodrigues, generating high waves that reached  along the island's southern coast.
March 4, 1965 – Tropical Depression Olive passed south of Rodrigues. It produced high seas and scattered thunderstorms as far west as Réunion.
The rains caused a landslide along the Rivière des Remparts.
Later, the storm crossed over Réunion, dropping record rainfall. Over a 24-hour period, Denise dropped  of rainfall at Foc Foc, Réunion, of which  fell over 12 hours; both precipitation totals are the highest recorded worldwide for their respective durations. Over 48 hours, precipitation totaled  at Bras Sec. The heavy rains caused flooding that killed three people, and caused severe road and crop damage. 
March 5, 1966 – Cyclone Ivy brushed St. Brandon with  winds, and later passed between Madagascar and Réunion.
December 17, 1966 – Tropical Storm Colette passed south west of Réunion, producing heavy rainfall on the island.
January 14, 1967 – Cyclone Gilberte brushed Mauritius and Réunion with heavy rainfall and gusty winds, reaching  on Mauritius.
February 12, 1967 – Tropical Storm Huguette produced  winds while passing east of Rodrigues.
The storm also dropped rainfall on Réunion.
January 21, 1968 – Cyclone Henriette passed just east of Rodrigues, producing  wind gusts.
January 30, 1968 – After emerging from Madagascar, Cyclone Georgette brought heavy, but beneficial rainfall to Réunion.
February 13, 1968 – Tropical Storm Ida brought gusty winds to Mauritius, as well as beneficial rainfall to Réunion.
March 10, 1968 – Tropical Storm Karine bypassed Réunion, bringing heavy rainfall that caused river flooding. Six people drowned on the island during the storm's passage.
The winds wrecked most of the island's crops, as well as many houses, while also causing severe erosion. The outskirts of Monique also produced high waves and dropped rainfall in Réunion. Damage from Carmen and Monique was estimated at US$5 million, with 3,500 people left homeless and 24 people injured.
November 1, 1968 – High waves from Tropical Storm Annie affected the north and east coast of Réunion.
January 1, 1969 – Tropical Storm Berthe passed north of the Mascarene Islands, bringing light rainfall and gusty winds to the islands.
February 1, 1969 – Cyclone Dany passed north of the Mascarene Islands, bringing heavy rainfall to Réunion that reached  at Foc Foc. The rains damaged coastal roads, and contributed to two deaths.
March 23, 1969 – Cyclone Helene passed east of Mauritius, resulting in several days of rainfall and rough seas for the Mascarene Islands.

1970s

January 12, 1970 – Cyclone Genevieve passed north of Réunion, bringing heavy rainfall to the island's northern portion.
January 25, 1970 – Tropical Storm Hermine dropped heavy rainfall on Réunion over four days, reaching . The rains flooded roads and crops, killing one person.
February 11, 1970 – Cyclone Iseult passed between Réunion and Mauritius.
January 25, 1971 – Cyclone Ginette looped south of Réunion, resulting in high waves and several days of rainfall.
January 31, 1971 – Cyclone Felicie emerged from the east coast of Madagascar, bringing thunderstorms to Réunion.
February 8, 1971 – Cyclone Helga passed southeast of Réunion and Mauritius, bringing heavy rainfall to the former island, reaching  at Commerson. Two people died on the island due to drowning.
February 26, 1971 – Cyclone Lise passed southeast of Rodrigues, and later produced rainfall in Réunion.
December 16, 1971 – Rainbands from Tropical Storm Agnes affected Réunion while the storm passed to the north.
February 7, 1972 – Tropical Storm Dolly brushed the southwest coast of Réunion, bringing days of heavy rainfall that reached  at Piton Tortue. The rains damaged crops and flooded coastal roads. Dolly killed five people on the island.
February 13, 1972 – Cyclone Eugenie brought beneficial rainfall to the Mascarene Islands while passing to the north.
The storm caused two fatalities on the island, as well as 16 injuries.
March 5, 1972 – Strengthening Tropical Storm Hermione passed north of the Mascarene Islands, producing heavy rainfall on Réunion that reached  at Foc Foc.
November 30, 1972 – Tropical Storm Ariane passed north of Mauritius and later executed a loop southeast of the island.
December 22, 1972 – Cyclone Beatrice brushed northern Rodrigues and eastern Mauritius, bringing rainfall.
January 8, 1973 – Tropical Storm Charlotte passed just southwest of Réunion, producing  wind gusts, as well as heavy rainfall reaching  at Riviere de L'Est. The rains damaged crops and flooded roads, which killed one person due to drowning.
January 13, 1973 – Tropical Storm Dorothee produced a series of thunderstorms on Réunion while the storm passed to the southwest. 
February 2, 1973 – Tropical Storm Hortense passed south of Réunion, bringing rainfall to the island. 
February 21, 1973 – Cyclone Jessy struck Rodrigues, bringing heavy rainfall and  wind gusts, causing power outages.
March 1, 1973 – Cyclone Kitty struck Rodrigues, causing power outages.
March 10, 1973 – Cyclone Lydie passed west of Réunion, producing  wind gusts in the mountainous peaks. The cyclone produced four days' of heavy rainfall on the island, reaching . Flooding killed 10 people on the island, and caused crop damage.
September 21, 1973 – Tropical Storm Alice produced high waves, flooding half of Île Raphael, while high winds damaged the radio antenna and roofing of the island's meteorological station.
January 3, 1974 – Tropical Storm Esmeralda looped to the southeast of Madagascar, bringing several days of rainfall to Réunion, reaching .
February 27, 1974 – High waves from Tropical Storm Ghislaine affected southeastern Rodrigues.
January 24, 1975 – Cyclone Deborah brushed the coast of Réunion with scattered thunderstorms while passing to the south of the island.
February 6, 1975 – Cyclone Gervaise struck Mauritius, where the calm of the eye lasted about three hours. The storm killed 10 people on the island and caused about US$200 million in damage. The storm destroyed about 13,000 houses, and also caused heavy damage to crops, power lines, and roads. 
March 16, 1975 – Cyclone Ines passed between Réunion and Mauritius, dropping heavy rainfall on both islands. Flooding rains destroyed several rain gauges on Réunion.
The storm also produced high waves that affected the northern coast of Réunion, flooding coastal roads.
January 8, 1977 – Cyclone Clarence passed near St. Brandon, producing high waves that destroyed four boats and several homes. Wind gusts on the island reached . For several days moved in a counterclockwise track around the Mascarene Islands, producing high waves and beneficial rainfall on Réunion.
January 31, 1977 – Tropical Storm Emilie passed north of Réunion, bringing beneficial rainfall for crops.
February 6, 1977 – Cyclone Fifi approached but turned away from western Réunion, bringing three days' of rainfall that reached  at Salazie. Flooding damaged crops and roads, and one person died while attempting to cross an inundated road.
February 8, 1977 – Tropical Storm Gilda passed between Rodrigues and St. Brandon, and later between Mauritius and Réunion, before being absorbed by Cyclone Fifi, causing minimal effects.
February 20, 1977 – Cyclone Hervea passed just south of Agaléga, dropping  of rainfall.
Heavy rainfall occurred on neighboring Réunion, reaching  at Foc Foc.
January 29, 1978 – Tropical Storm Huberte brushed Rodrigues with gusty winds.
March 7, 1978 – Tropical Storm Kiki reformed near Mauritius and latter passed just southeast of Réunion. On the latter island, rainfall reached , which flooded coastal roads, damaged bridges, and killed two people.
January 7, 1979 – Cyclone Benjamine passed between Réunion and Mauritius. On the former island, the storm dropped heavy rainfall, reaching  at Gite de Bellecombe, along with  wind gusts at St. Denis. The storm damaged or destroyed 194 houses, while also damaging crops and power lines.
February 4, 1979 – Cyclone Celine looped near Mauritius while intensifying, later passing just north of Rodrigues. Wind gusts on the latter island reached . The storm killed about half of the population of the critically endangered Rodrigues flying fox.
February 15, 1979 – For several days, tropical storms Estelle and Fatou moved around the Mascarene Islands, which produced heavy rainfall on Réunion that reached  at Petite Plaine.
The storm caused 5 fatalities, 257 injuries, and US$175 million in damage on the island. About 5,000 houses were destroyed or severely damaged. Effects on neighboring Réunion were limited to  wind gusts and some rainfall.

1980s

January 15, 1980 – Cyclone Hyacinthe formed north of Mauritius, and for two weeks moved slowly to the west of the Mascarene Islands. The cyclone produced record rainfall that caused $167 million (676 million francs) in damage and killed 25 people. Over 14 days, Hyacinthe dropped  of rainfall at Commerson Crater in the mountainous peaks of Réunion, making the storm the wettest tropical cyclone on record. The highest daily total was on January 25, when  fell at Commerson. The rains caused flooding and hundreds of mudslides. About half of the roads on the island were damaged, with road damage estimated at $40 million (1980 USD, 161.3 million francs).
Heavy rainfall filled dams to capacity on Rodrigues.
March 5, 1980 – Cyclone Kolia executed two loops near the Mascarene Islands, bringing the storm between Réunion and Mauritius twice. Wind gusts reached  on Mauritius.
The storm damaged crops, power lines, and houses, leaving 500 people homeless. Cilaos and Salazie became isolated during the storm. Two people were injured on the island. Winds on Mauritius reached .
January 31, 1981 – Tropical Depression Helyette passed south of Rodrigues, and the next day moved over Mauritius and just southeast of Réunion.
April 9, 1981 – Tropical Storm Lisa executed a loop north of the Mascarene Islands, coming within  of Mauritius. Flooding caused road damage in the latter island.
The storm damaged crops and houses, with monetary damage estimated around U$650,000.
February 20, 1982 – A tropical depression brought several days of rainfall to Mauritius before dissipating. 
The storm damaged or destroyed every house on the island, leaving the 350 residents without power, food, water, or shelter. Andry injured 30 people and killed one on the island.
The cyclone caused eight injuries, one of them serious when a damaged house collapsed. Damage on Mauritius was estimated at RS300 million (US$21 million). Rainfall on Réunion reached .
January 16, 1985 – While executing a loop, Tropical Storm Celestina struck Réunion.
February 7, 1986 – Severe Tropical Storm Erinesta bypassed Réunion to the west, bringing several days of heavy rainfall that totaled  at Cilaos, of which  fell over 24 hours. The storm caused flooding, but also helped replenish aquifer levels after two years of drought conditions.
March 12, 1986 – Intensifying Cyclone Honorinina brushed St. Brandon with  wind gusts.
January 4, 1987 – A tropical depression passed just west of Réunion, dropping  of rainfall at Dos d'Âne.
Clotilda killed 10 people and destroyed over 120 houses, with damage estimated at US$2 million.
January 2, 1988 – Tropical Depression Benandro produced wind gusts of  while passing north of Réunion.
January 28, 1989 – Cyclone Firinga brushed the northwest coast of Mauritius, causing about $60 million (1989 USD) in damage and one fatality. A day later, Firinga made landfall on Réunion, where the cyclone killed 10 people and caused ₣1 billion (1989 francs, $157 million 1989 USD) in damage. Rainfall on Réunion reached  at Pas de Bellecombe. The high rainfall caused flooding and landslides, and left 60% of the island without power.
March 25, 1989 – Developing Tropical Storm Jinabo dropped heavy rainfall on Réunion, reaching  at Sainte-Rose.
April 5, 1989 – Cyclone Krisy passed north of Rodrigues, producing  gusts and 97.6 mm (3.84 mm) of rainfall. Later, the storm struck Mauritius, where wind gusts reached , compounding on the crop damage caused by Firinga two months prior. A farmer killed himself due to the threat of the storm.

1990s

The cyclone also destroyed over 90% of the crops on the island were destroyed, and killed half of the critically endangered Rodrigues flying fox. 
Colina killed two people on the island, and also caused power outages and crop damage.
January 22, 1993 – High waves caused by a polar trough and Tropical Storm Dessilia affect southwestern Réunion.
Rainfall reached  on Mauritius.
February 13, 1993 – Developing Tropical Storm Finella passed southwest of Réunion, dropping  of rainfall at Saint-Benoît.
February 27, 1993 – A tropical disturbance, later named Hutelle despite not attaining tropical storm status, dropped torrential rainfall on Réunion, reaching  in some locations.
December 21, 1993 – Weakening Tropical Storm Cecilia passed north of Mauritius and Réunion, with rainfall on the latter island reaching  over 24 hours.
Hollanda killed two people during its passage and left US$135 million in damage (1994 USD); The storm heavily damaged or destroyed 450 houses, leaving 1,500 people homeless. The storm was the most damaging for the island since Cyclone Gervise in 1975. Hollanda caused the island's gross domestic product to decline by 10%. The cyclone later brushed the coast of Réunion. Rainfall on Réunion reached .
March 10, 1994 – Tropical Storm Kelvina dropped heavy rainfall on Réunion while passing west of the island, reaching .
March 13, 1994 – High waves from Cyclone Litanne affected the northern coast of Réunion and Mauritius.
January 6, 1995 – Developing Tropical Storm Christelle absorbed Tropical Storm Bentha near the Mascarene Islands. For five days, the two storms brought rainfall to Mauritius and Réunion.
March 13, 1995 – Tropical Storm Kylie struck Réunion, producing winds of 100 km/h (65 km/h).
March 16, 1995 – Tropical Depression Lidy stalled near Rodrigues, dropping  of rainfall and causing flooding damage.
December 30, 1995 – Tropical Depression B2 dropped  of rainfall on Réunion while passing to the west of the island.
February 25, 1996 – Cyclone Edwige produced  while passing north of Réunion.
April 6, 1996 – Cyclone Hansella moved over Rodrigues, dropping a month's worth of rainfall –  – in a 24-hour period. The storm later dropped rainfall in Réunion.
About half of the island lost power, and there were three storm related deaths.
February 21, 1997 – Tropical Storm Karlette passed south of Rodrigues, dropping  of rainfall on the island.
February 10, 1998 – Cyclone Anacelle passed west of St. Brandon, and a day later west of Mauritius, producing gusty winds and rainfall on both islands.
The rains caused flooding, landslides, and power outages.
February 3, 1999 – Tropical Storm Chikita passed north of Rodrigues, Mauritius, and Réunion, providing beneficial rainfall.
March 9, 1999 – The eyewall of Cyclone Davina crossed over Mauritius, a day after passing north of Rodrigues and a day prior to passing west of Réunion. Rainfall on Réunion reached  in the island's center. Two people drowned in the Rivière des Galets, but otherwise the rainfall proved beneficial in alleviating dry conditions.

2000s

January 29, 2000 – Cyclone Connie passed north of Mauritius and Réunion as a weakening storm, bringing heavy rainfall to both islands. At Commerson Crater on Réunion, rainfall reached . One man died on Mauritius during the storm while attempting to secure his house, and two died on Réunion.
February 14, 2000 – Cyclone Eline passed north of Mauritius and Réunion, dropping  of rainfall at Bébourg, Réunion.
February 27, 2000 – The tropical disturbance that later became Tropical Storm Gloria produced gale-force winds on Tromelin and St. Brandon.
January 6, 2001 – While passing west of Réunion, Cyclone Ando dropped heavy rainfall reaching  at Pas de Bellecombe. The rains caused landslides and flooding that killed two people.
January 25, 2001 – former Cyclone Charly dropped rainfall on Mauritius and Réunion as a weak disturbance drifting to the south of the islands.
April 6, 2001 – Severe Tropical Storm Evariste passed east of St. Brandon, and a day later to the southwest of Rodrigues, producing rainfall and gusty winds.
January 20, 2002 – Cyclone Dina passed north of Rodrigues, where rough waves killed five fishermen. Over the next two days, Dina moved north of Mauritius, where damage totaled $50 million, largely from agriculture losses. Four people died on the island. Dina also passed near Réunion, producing  wind gusts at Maïdo, the highest on record for the island. In the mountainous peaks of Réunion, rainfall reached  in La Plaine des Chicots. The rains caused flooding that contributed to six deaths and left €95 million (US$83.4 million) in damage. The Ravine des Cabris reached an all-time record flood while three other rivers reached their second-highest levels, only behind flooding from Cyclone Firinga in 1989. 
It dropped  of rainfall in Bébourg, which caused river flooding that killed one person. Light rainfall occurred in neighboring Mauritius.
December 27, 2002 – Cyclone Crystal dropped light rainfall on Mauritius while passing to the east of the island.
February 13, 2003 – As part of an outbreak of four storms across the Indian Ocean, Cyclone Gerry produced high waves, gusty winds, and rainfall on Mauritius, killing one person due to electrocution.
March 12, 2003 – Cyclone Kalunde approached within  of Rodrigues to the east, leaving the island without power, and causing €3.4 million (US$3.15 million) in damage.
November 25, 2003 – Cyclone Beni dissipated north of the archipelago, bringing rainfall to Réunion.
Heavy rainfall – peaking at  – helped end drought conditions on the island.
February 1, 2004 – The interaction of cyclones Elita and Frank produced high waves on the western shores of Mauritius and Réunion.
March 5, 2004 – While intensifying into the most intense tropical cyclone in the basin, Cyclone Gafilo dropped  of rainfall on Réunion, well to the south of the storm's center.
May 16, 2004 – former Tropical Storm Juba passed just west of Rodrigues, dropping beneficial rainfall to an area facing drought conditions.
February 2, 2005 – The monsoonal depression that later became Tropical Storm Gerard passed over Rodrigues.
January 24, 2006 – Developing Tropical Storm Boloetse dropped rainfall on the Mascarene Islands while passing west of the islands. On Mauritius, Vacoas recorded  of rainfall over 24 hours.
February 15, 2006 – A developing tropical storm dropped 1-in-50 year rainfall rates on Réunion. A station in the capital Saint-Denis recorded  in just three hours, and over 48 hours, Le Brûlé recorded  of precipitation.
March 4, 2006 – Tropical Storm Diwa passed northwest of Réunion, dropping torrential rainfall in the island's mountainous center. Grand-Îlet recorded  over four days. Diwa contributed to 10 deaths on Réunion – four due to road accidents, three from using generators inside their homes, two due to a landslide, and one related to flooding.
January 1, 2007 – High waves from Tropical Storm Clovis affected the north coast of Mauritius.
Port Sud Est recorded  of rainfall, and wind gusts reached .

February 23, 2007 – Cyclone Gamede began dropping rainfall on Réunion, and for the next several days the storm meandered to the northwest of the island. Over a four-day period from February 24–28, Commerson Crater in Réunion's mountainous interior recorded  of rainfall, breaking the world record for the most precipitation recorded over 72 hours and 96 hours, set previously during Cyclone Hyacinthe in 1980. Over a nine-day period, the same station recorded . The rains caused flooding that washed out a bridge near Saint-Louis, with the cost estimated at €20 million (2007 EUR, $26 million 2007 USD). Two people died on Réunion while attempting to cross flooded roads. The storm also dropped amounts of rainfall on St. Brandon and Mauritius. Gamede caused two fatalities and left 70% of Mauritius without power.
March 8, 2007 – Developing Cyclone Indlala passed just north of St. Brandon, where  of rainfall was recorded.
April 1, 2007 – Cyclone Jaya passed north of St. Brandon, where  of rainfall was reported.
Celina's rainfall contributed to a traffic fatality on Réunion, where precipitation reached  in Plaine des Chicots.
January 8, 2008 – A tropical disturbance dropped heavy rainfall on Mauritius.
February 23, 2008 – former Cyclone Hondo traversed Réunion as a tropical disturbance, 16 days after Hondo became an intense tropical cyclone. Heavy rainfall associated with the storm reached  in the volcanic peak of the island.
March 22, 2008 – Tropical Storm Lola weakened to a tropical depression while stalling north of Mauritius. The storm dropped heavy rainfall on the island, which contributed to four deaths.
February 4, 2009 – Intensifying Cyclone Gael passed north of Rodrigues and south of St. Brandon; a station in the latter island recorded  of rainfall. An intense rainband struck Réunion while Gael traversed the waters between the island and Madagascar, with the highest wind gust –  – and rainfall –  recorded in the volcanic peak. The cyclone caused two fatalities on Réunion.
April 6, 2009 – Severe Tropical Storm Jade struck northeastern Madagascar, but its outer rainbands dropped rainfall on Réunion on two separate occasions, reaching . Flooding left over €15 million (U$20 million) in damage.

2010s

February 20, 2010 – Weakening Cyclone Gelane moved between Mauritius and Rodrigues, dropping  of rainfall on the latter island.
March 7, 2010 – The formative stages of Tropical Storm Hubert produced an area of thunderstorms from Réunion to Madagascar.
March 19, 2011 – Tropical Storm Cherono passed just south of Rodrigues, producing gusty winds.
January 21, 2012 – A teenager was electrocuted during the passage of Tropical Storm Ethel.
February 11, 2012 – The passage of Cyclone Giovanna to the north caused the airport and port to be closed in Mauritius.
February 21, 2012 – The approach of Tropical Storm Hilwa brought gusty winds to Rodrigues.
The winds caused power outages that killed one person. Agricultural damage totaled €31 million (US$41.3 million).
January 31, 2013 – High winds and rainfall from Cyclone Felleng left 11,200 homes without power on Réunion.
April 15, 2013 – For several days, Cyclone Imelda approached Rodrigues, dropping  of rainfall.
December 21, 2013 – Cyclone Amara made its closest approach to Rodrigues, producing  winds. About 80% of the island lost power.
January 2, 2014 – Cyclone Bejisa passed just west of Réunion, dropping  of rainfall at Cilaos. The heavy rains left €63 million (US$85.2 million) in agriculture damage on the island. One person died from head trauma while 16 people were injured in various incidents.
February 6, 2014 – Tropical Storm Edilson passed just east of Mauritius, dropping  of rainfall.
January 14, 2015 – Intensifying Cyclone Bansi produced  wind gusts and flooded the entirety of Île Raphael in St. Brandon. The cyclone also affected Mauritius and Rodrigues, dropping  of rainfall in the latter island.
January 17, 2015 – Tropical Storm Chedza emerged from Madagascar into the Indian Ocean, bringing a plume of moisture over Réunion that reached  in Salazie.
March 9, 2015 – Tropical Storm Haliba dropped heavy rainfall on Réunion, with  recorded in one hour, and a total of  recorded over four days. The rains closed roads on the island and caused mudslides on nearby Mauritius.
February 8, 2017 – Tropical Storm Carlos passed west of the archipelago, leaving 4,000 people without power on Réunion, and causing flooding on Mauritius.
January 18, 2018 – While passing southeast of Mauritius and Réunion, Cyclone Berguitta caused flooding and produced  winds, which knocked down trees and left over 72,000 people without power.
March 5, 2018 – Cyclone Dumazile passed between Réunion and Madagascar, producing flooding rainfall and gusty winds on the former island.
March 18, 2018 – High waves from Tropical Storm Eliakim affected coastal roads in Réunion, and wind gusts reached  on the island.
April 24, 2018 – Cyclone Fakir passed just east of Réunion, causing €15 million (US$17 million) in damage and killing two people due to a landslide. A late-season storm, Fakir dropped  of rainfall in a 24-hour period, as well as producing  wind gusts. The heavy rainfall caused flooding and landslides.
December 23, 2018 – Cyclone Cilida passed east of Mauritius, bringing beneficial rainfall as well as gusty winds that knocked down tree branches.
February 7, 2019 – The threat from Cyclone Funani prompted officials to cancel flights on Rodrigues.
February 10, 2019 – Cyclone Gelena passed just southwest of Rodrigues, producing strong winds that left 90% of the island without power.
Joaninha damaged more than 100 houses and caused widespread power outages.

Climatological statistics

Notes

References

 
Lists of tropical cyclones by area
South-West Indian Ocean tropical cyclones